Tor Øyvind Hovda (born 24 September 1989 in Ringerike) is a Norwegian footballer who plays for Hønefoss  as a midfielder.

Club career
Hovda played youth football for both Heradsbygda IL and later Hønefoss BK, where he made his first senior appearance in 2007. Allsvenskan club Kalmar FF signed Hovda for the 2014 season, and he scored the first goal on 27 October against Mjällby AIF. He plays most of the games in the central midfield.

In 2016 he joined Sarpsborg 08.

Honours
Hønefoss BK
1. Division: 2011

References

1989 births
Living people
Norwegian footballers
Norwegian expatriate footballers
Expatriate footballers in Sweden
Norwegian expatriate sportspeople in Sweden
Association football midfielders
Hønefoss BK players
Allsvenskan players
Kalmar FF players
Åtvidabergs FF players
Eliteserien players
Norwegian First Division players
Sarpsborg 08 FF players
People from Ringerike (municipality)
Sportspeople from Viken (county)